Burnley is a town in Lancashire, England.  Its unparished area contains 190 buildings that are recorded in the National Heritage List for England as designated listed buildings.   Of these, one is listed at Grade I, the highest of the three grades, three are at Grade II*, the middle grade, and the others are at Grade II, the lowest grade.

Burnley was originally a market town, having been granted the right to hold a market from 1294, and it was surrounded by farmland.  Much of this changed with the arrival of the Industrial Revolution.  The Leeds and Liverpool Canal came to the town from Leeds in 1796, continuing west in 1801, finally connecting to Liverpool in 1816 and the town then developed into a major cotton town. Its population rose from about 4,000 in 1801 to over 97,000 a century later.  During the second half of the 19th century it became "one of the most important cotton-weaving towns in the world".  The number of looms in the town rose from 9,000 in 1850 to 79,000 in 1900, and more large mills were built in the early years of the 20th century.

In 1974 the borough of Burnley was established, which included the town of Burnley and surrounding towns, villages and countryside.  Many of the outlying areas continued to be civil parishes, but the town of Burnley itself is unparished.  This list contains the listed buildings in the unparished area of Burnley.  The listed buildings in the outlying civil parishes are included in separate lists.

The listing buildings in the unparished area of Burnley reflect its history.  Most of the oldest buildings originated as farmhouses or farm buildings, and also include the parish church, the country house Towneley Hall, and structures associated with these.  Later there are structures associated with the Leeds and Liverpool Canal, and with the East Lancashire Railway, which arrived in the town toward the middle of the 19th century.  The later buildings include industrial buildings, in particular cotton mills, together with houses for their workers, and villas for those who became wealthy at the time.  There are also the buildings common to all towns, such as churches, schools, public houses, shops, banks, offices, a music hall, structures in public parks, and civic buildings.

Key

Buildings

See also

Listed buildings in Briercliffe
Listed buildings in Cliviger
Listed buildings in Habergham Eaves
Listed buildings in Hapton, Lancashire
Listed buildings in Ightenhill
Listed buildings in Padiham
Listed buildings in Worsthorne-with-Hurstwood

References

Citations

Sources

 

Lists of listed buildings in Lancashire
Buildings and structures in Burnley